The Men's all events singles event at the 2010 South American Games was the sum of the four previous competitions, and served as a qualifying to the Master event, qualifying the top 16.

Medalists

Results

References
Report

Overall Singles